Kate Collins is the author of the best-selling Flower Shop Mysteries.

Biography
Kate Collins, an Indiana native, graduated from Purdue University with a master's degree in education. She taught elementary school for six years, but after the birth of her first child, gave up her teaching career to pursue a writing career. After writing short humorous stories for children's magazines and working part-time as a legal secretary, she sold her first historical romance novel in 1995. Since then she has published seven historical romantic suspenses and eight mysteries

Her books have made The New York Times Best Seller list, Barnes & Noble mass market mystery best-sellers' lists, the Independent Booksellers' best-seller's lists, as well as booksellers' lists in Australia and England.

Some of her books were adapted for television as the Flower Shop Mysteries in 2016, starring Brooke Shields as her florist/detective Abby Knight.

Bibliography

The Flower Shop Mysteries
Mum's the Word, Signet, November 2004
Slay It With Flowers, Signet, March 2005
Dearly Depotted, Signet, July 2005
Snipped in the Bud, Signet, May 2006
Acts of Violets, Signet, March 2007
A Rose From the Dead, Signet, December 2007
Shoots To Kill, Signet, August 2008
Evil in Carnations,  Signet, February 2009
Sleeping With Anemone, Signet, February 2010
Dirty Rotten Tendrils, Signet, October 2010
Night of the Living Dandelion, Signet, April 2011
To Catch a Leaf, Signet, November 2011
Nightshade on Elm Street , Signet, November 6, 2012
Seed No Evil, Signet August 2013
Throw in the Trowel, Signet, February 2014
A Root Awakening, Signet, February 2015
Florist Grump, Signet, November 2015
Moss Hysteria, Signet, April 5, 2016
Yews with Caution,, Berkley, May 30, 2017
Missing Under the Mistletoe Christmas Novella,, Independently published, September 18, 2018
Tulips Too Late Spring Novella, Independently published, June 13, 2018
The Jillian Knight Osborne Fashionista Diaries: A Flower Shop Mystery Short Story, eBook, August 26, 2020
A Frond in Need Summer Novella, Independently published, August 31, 2020
Till Death Do Us Pot Fall Novella, Independently published, November 8, 2020
Kick the Bouquet, Independently published, January 6, 2023

References

External links
Kate Collins' official site
All Romance Writers
Prime Crime

21st-century American novelists
American mystery writers
Year of birth missing (living people)
Living people
Purdue University College of Education alumni
Place of birth missing (living people)
Novelists from Indiana
American women novelists
Women mystery writers
21st-century American women writers